Halosphaeria is a genus of fungi in the family Halosphaeriaceae. The genus contains four species.

References

Sordariomycetes genera
Microascales